Saussurea weberi is a species of flowering plant in the genus Saussurea, the saw-worts. It is endemic to the U.S. states of Montana, Colorado and Wyoming and considered imperiled to vulnerable globally.

Habitat 
Saussurea weberi is found in moist alpine meadows.

Threats 
This plant's range is limited by its highly specific alpine habitat requirements. The greatest threat to its continued survival is anthropogenic climate change.

References

weberi
Flora of the United States